Berlin Blues is a 2003 German film by Leander Haußmann based on the novel of the same name by Sven Regener.

Plot summary 
Frank Lehmann (Christian Ulmen) is a bartender working in Kreuzberg, a borough of West Berlin in October 1989, in the final weeks before the fall of the Berlin Wall. As he is approaching his 30th birthday, his friends start teasing him by calling him "Herr Lehmann" ("Mr. Lehmann"). He has little interest in anything outside of SO 36, the eastern part of the borough of Kreuzberg. He has a brief relationship with Katrin, a cook at a nearby bar. His best friend, Karl (Detlev Buck), slowly goes mad, and his parents show up for a visit, disrupting his laid-back lifestyle.

Cast

Awards 
At the 2004 German Film Awards, Detlev Buck was awarded Best Supporting Actor and Sven Regener Best Script.

At the 2003 Bavarian Film Awards, Christian Ulmen was awarded Best Actor.

External links 

Films set in Berlin
Films about the Berlin Wall
2003 films
Films based on German novels
Films set in the 1980s
Films set in West Germany
German drama films
2000s German films